Chlorquinaldol is an antimicrobial agent and antiseptic. It is a chlorinated derivative of the popular chelating agent 8-hydroxyquinoline.  It is applied topically as a cream and internally as a losenge.

It was marketed by Geigy as an intestinal antiseptic and amebicide with the trade name Siosteran.

References

Antiprotozoal agents
Antiseptics
Chloroarenes
Quinolinols